Vascular cell adhesion protein 1 also known as vascular cell adhesion molecule 1 (VCAM-1) or cluster of differentiation 106 (CD106) is a protein that in humans is encoded by the VCAM1 gene. VCAM-1 functions as a cell adhesion molecule.

Structure
VCAM-1 is a member of the immunoglobulin superfamily, the superfamily of proteins including antibodies and T-cell receptors. The VCAM-1 gene contains six or seven immunoglobulin domains, and is expressed on both large and small blood vessels only after the endothelial cells are stimulated by cytokines. It is alternatively spliced into two known RNA transcripts that encode different isoforms in humans. The gene product is a cell surface sialoglycoprotein, a type I membrane protein that is a member of the Ig superfamily.

Function 

The VCAM-1 protein mediates the adhesion of lymphocytes, monocytes, eosinophils, and basophils to vascular endothelium. It also functions in leukocyte-endothelial cell signal transduction, and it may play a role in the development of atherosclerosis and rheumatoid arthritis.

Upregulation of VCAM-1 in endothelial cells by cytokines occurs as a result of increased gene transcription (e.g., in response to tumor necrosis factor-alpha (TNF-α) and interleukin-1 (IL-1)) and through stabilization of messenger RNA (mRNA) (e.g., Interleukin-4 (IL-4)). The promoter region of the VCAM1 gene contains functional tandem NF-κB (nuclear factor-kappa B) sites. The sustained expression of VCAM-1 lasts over 24 hours.

Primarily, the VCAM-1 protein is an endothelial ligand for VLA-4 (Very Late Antigen-4 or integrin α4β1) of the β1 subfamily of integrins. VCAM-1 expression has also been observed in other cell types (e.g., smooth muscle cells). It has also been shown to interact with EZR and Moesin.

VCAM-1 is also upregulated if vWF (Von Willebrand Factor) is given in knock-out (KO) ADMATS13 mice but not on mice without KO.

CD106 also exists on the surface of some subpopulations of mesenchymal stem cells (MSC).

Pharmacology 
Certain melanoma cells can use VCAM-1 to adhere to the endothelium, VCAM-1 may participate in monocyte recruitment to atherosclerotic sites, and it is highly overexpressed in the inflamed brain. As a result, VCAM-1 is a potential drug target.

References

Further reading

External links 
 
 

SIGLEC